The 2012 Sucrogen Townsville 400 was a motor race for the Australian sedan-based V8 Supercars. It was the seventh event of the 2012 International V8 Supercars Championship. It was held on the weekend of 6–8 July at the Townsville Street Circuit, in Townsville, Queensland.

Standings
 After 15 of 30 races.

Sucrogen